The Arad ostraca, also known as the Eliashib Archive, is a collection of more than 200 inscribed pottery shards (also known as sherds or potsherds) found at Tel Arad in the 1960s by archeologist Yohanan Aharoni. Arad was an Iron Age fort at the southern outskirts of the Kingdom of Judah, close to Beersheba in modern Israel.

One hundred and seven of the ostraca are written in the Paleo-Hebrew alphabet and dated to circa 600 BCE. Of the ostraca dated to later periods, the bulk are written in Aramaic and a few in Greek and Arabic.

The majority of the Hebrew ostraca are lists of names and administrative letters to the commanders of the fort; everyday correspondence between military supply masters, requests for supplies, and so on. Most of them are addressed to Eliashib (also transliterated Elyashiv; not to be confused with the biblical high priest Eliashib), thought to be the quartermaster of Arad.

Eighteen ostraca consisting mainly of letters addressed to Eliashib were found in a chamber of the casemate wall of the fort. These are known as the Eliashib Archive.

Literacy rate 

In 2020, an algorithmic handwriting study revealed that the Arad ostraca must have had at least twelve different authors, of which 4-7 were stationed at Arad. Since Arad's garrison is estimated to only about 20-30 soldiers, the result supports a high literacy rate for the Judahite kingdom. The author of the study suggested that the high literacy rate could mean that some Bible books were written before the Babylonian conquest of Judah.

Sherds

Ostracon 1 

The inscription reads:

The Kittim were Greek mercenaries, probably from Cyprus and the Aegean islands, employed by Judah to defend the southern frontier.

Ostracon 3 

Nadav Na'aman translates the text as follows:

Ostracon 16 
The ostracon is inscribed both on the front and on the back (recto and verso). The frontside reads:

And the backside:

When the ostracon was found, the text side on the backside were unintelligible but in 2017 a team of researchers were able to reconstruct the text using multispectral imaging techniques.

Ostracon 18 
Ostracon 18, also known as the House of Yahweh ostracon, has an inscription that reads:

The Kerosite may refer to someone who was a Nethinim, a temple servant.

The ostracon is notable because of the ending, "house of YHWH", which, according to many scholars, may be a reference to the Jerusalem temple. Philip J. King and Lawrence E. Stager argues that since the temple at Arad was demolished 100 years prior to when the ostracon was written it therefore must refer to the Jerusalem temple. Other scholars doubt whether the inscription refers to the Jerusalem temple.

Ostracon 24 
Philip J. King translates the text as follows:

The letter has been interpreted as ordering the commander of the fort to dispatch reinforcements to withstand an Edomite attack.

See also 
 Canaanite and Aramaic inscriptions
 Three shekel ostracon
 Samaria ostraca
 Lachish letters

References

Citations

Sources 

 
 
 
 
 
 
 
 
 
 
 
 
 
 AHARONI, Y. “Hebrew Ostraca from Tel Arad.” Israel Exploration Journal 16, no. 1 (1966): 1–7. http://www.jstor.org/stable/27925035.

6th-century BC inscriptions
1960s archaeological discoveries
Hebrew inscriptions
Archaeology of Israel
Biblical archaeology
Cylinder and impression seals in archaeology